General Miguel Primo de Rivera's dictatorship over Spain began with a coup on 13 September 1923 and ended with his resignation on 28 January 1930. It took place during the wider reign of King Alfonso XIII. In establishing his dictatorship, Primo de Rivera ousted the liberal government led by Prime Minister Manuel García Prieto and initially gained the support of King Alfonso XIII and the army. During the Military Directory (1923–1925), the dictatorship created the official party of the regime, the Unión Patriótica (UP). It also censored the Spanish press and worked to eliminate separatism in Catalonia. Under Primo de Rivera's dictatorship, Spain won the Rif War, where Spanish forces fought Riffian tribes in Morocco.

Primo de Rivera's dictatorship established the Civil Directory in 1925. During the Civil Directory, Primo de Rivera created the National Assembly, where Spanish corporations had their interests represented. The dictatorship formed good relationships with Italy and increased its interactions with countries in Latin America. It invested heavily in Spanish infrastructure, such as roads and railways, and expanded labour laws to assist nursing mothers in the workforce. Throughout the dictatorship, women became an increasing percentage of Spain's skilled labour. In 1929 an economic downturn occurred, and the value of the Spanish peseta fell. The army's grievances with Primo de Rivera grew, and seeing this, the King stopped supporting the dictatorship. Primo de Rivera resigned in 1930, ending his dictatorship, and General Dámaso Berenguer succeeded him before Spain's Second Republic was established in 1931.

Background 
After the 1898 Spanish defeat to the United States, where Spain lost its remaining colonies in the Philippines, Cuba, and Puerto Rico, Spain experienced increasing social strife. Along with the defeat of Annual in 1921 against Riffian tribesmen in Spain’s Moroccan Protectorate, Spain was dominated by a desire for regeneration. Following the defeat at Annual, the Spanish parliament inquired into assigning responsibility for the loss. Right before Primo de Rivera took over, the results of this inquiry were going to be released to the public, and they implicated many high-ranking military officials. This exacerbated the deteriorating relationship between the politicians and the military, who felt the politicians were to blame. The military at first planned to install a new government led by General Francisco Aguilera, president of the Supreme Council of Military Justice, but they ultimately chose Primo de Rivera to lead this new government.

The coup (1923) 
On 13 September, Primo de Rivera staged a successful coup d’état in Barcelona in the mould of 19th-century pronunciamientos. With the army's support, he ousted the parliamentary government of Manuel García Prieto. Primo de Rivera stated he would create a temporary government to save Spain from the corrupt politicians that had been mismanaging it since 1898. Shortly after, on 14 September, King Alfonso XIII declared his support for Primo de Rivera's coup and dismissed the civilian government, suspending the 1876 Spanish constitution. He made Primo de Rivera the head of a new Military Directory, with powers to propose "whatever decrees are convenient" to the king.

There was initially a lot of support in Spain for the coup. Not only were conservative newspapers like La Vanguardia supportive, liberal media such as El Sol also stated their support for the regime on the understanding that Primo de Rivera would leave power in three months, as he initially declared. In El Sol, Jose Ortega y Gasset wrote: "The alpha and omega of the military directory's task is to do away with the old politics. Their goal is so excellent as to preclude reservations." The Catholic Church and the wider Spanish public also showed their backing of the dictatorship, and the stock market rising immediately after the coup is indicative of the confidence Spaniards had in the new regime. Some of the only detractors of the coup were the small Communist party (Partido Comunista de España) and Anarchist trade unions.

The Military Directory (1923–1925)

Ideology 
The Military Directory consisted of eight generals and one admiral. They were subordinate to Primo de Rivera, who could alone approve Decrees for the Directory and present them to the king to sign. Primo de Rivera framed the formation of his dictatorship as a patriotic action against the ineffectiveness of Spain's liberal system. Through this, Primo de Rivera presented himself as Joaquín Costa's 'Iron Surgeon,' who would perform surgery on Spain to cure the political corruption and social chaos that plagued it. He stated: "I have no experience in government. Our methods are as simple as they are ingenious. They are methods for which the good of the [homeland] dictates and our resolutions are taken while we are kneeling at the shrine of the national spirit." Primo de Rivera connected many of his speeches with religious themes, and Catholicism was integral to his dictatorship's discourse. Primo de Rivera stated how disseminating patriotism was 'preaching', and he collaborated with the Catholic Church throughout his dictatorship to promote patriotism and patriotic ideas on a large scale.

Policies 
Primo de Rivera ordered the termination of all local governments as he attempted to remove political corruption in Spain, replacing the civil officials with military supervised positions. In April 1924, Primo de Rivera created the Unión Patriótica (UP). UP was the official party of the dictatorship, and it united around vague patriotic ideas, taking the motto: Nation, Church, and King. The party's creation aimed to give the dictatorship credibility and maintain the public's conformity under Primo de Rivera's dictatorship. Once in power, Primo de Rivera's dictatorship quickly enforced laws against separatism, which banned teaching the Catalan language, singing the Catalan national anthem, and displaying the Catalan flag. After the coup, the dictatorship also imposed rigid censorship on the press. It censored all publications, telephones, and telegraphs and encouraged them to promote patriotic ideas.

The Rif War 
Primo de Rivera promised early into the Military Directory that he would find a quick solution to the Rif War, where Riffian rebels opposed the Spanish colonial presence in northern Morocco. Primo de Rivera initially aimed to negotiate with Abd-el-Krim, the Riffian leader, to end the conflict. He withdrew 29,000 recruits from Spain's Moroccan Protectorate by the end of 1923 and an additional 26,000 by March 1924. In total, Primo de Rivera abandoned 180 military bases by mid-December. In doing so, he also aimed to reduce the costs of the campaign to Spain and the dictatorship. This withdrawal displeased many africanistas in the army, who encouraged a more aggressive policy in Morocco. The pressure from the africanistas, along with an escalating Riffian offensive in 1924, persuaded Primo de Rivera that continuing his withdrawal would have severe political consequences and could endanger his regime. His dictatorship secured French aid in 1925, and following a successful military operation in Al Hoceima, Spain and France pushed back Abd-el-Krim's forces and regained some control of the Spanish protectorate. After the dictatorship's victory, the Military Directory organised celebrations country-wide. It awarded Primo de Rivera a high honour in the Spanish military, the Gran Cruz Laureada de San Fernando.

The Civil Directory (1925–1930)

The new government 
In December 1925, Primo de Rivera's dictatorship transitioned from the Military Directory to the Civil Directory. During the Civil Directory, Primo de Rivera created the National Assembly, where corporate interests were represented rather than voters' individual interests. Groups such as the UP, the Church, and the army were represented in the National Assembly, along with local governments and various economic organisations. Primo de Rivera also decreed that the military officials still holding government positions must return to their military duties, and civil governors were appointed to replace them. With the creation of the Civil Directory, Primo de Rivera rejected returning to a parliamentary system, as promised in 1923, and oriented towards a long-term rule for his dictatorship.

Foreign policy 
Primo de Rivera's dictatorship formed good relationships with Fascist Italy. The dictatorship banned the press from attacking Fascist Italy, and Primo de Rivera spoke of his admiration for Italy's Prime Minister, Mussolini. Primo de Rivera also linked his dictatorship to Spain's former colonies in Latin America. The dictatorship organised many initiatives to further these relations, such as the 1929 Iberian-American Exhibition in Seville, where it invited Latin American countries to attend. It signed commercial treaties with Argentina and Cuba, and established radio-telegraph links with Uruguay and Brazil, among other Latin-American countries. After the Rif War, Primo de Rivera's dictatorship pushed for Tangier to be included in the Spanish protectorate in Morocco. A conference with France in 1927 failed to settle the matter, as did a 1928 conference with France, Italy, and Britain. All the dictatorship gained was the post of the city's chief of police and improvements in the protection of arms trafficking in Tangier's international zone. Primo de Rivera also launched an unsuccessful campaign for Spain to have a permanent seat in the League of Nations in 1926, leaving and re-joining the League of Nations in the process, still as a non-permanent member.

Economic policies 
Primo de Rivera's dictatorship nationalised Spain's economy throughout the Civil Directory. It suppressed free trade and strictly supervised all economic activity in Spain. In 1927, the dictatorship created CAMPSA, a Spanish oil monopoly, by confiscating the installations and sales outlets of private oil companies in Spain, including large foreign firms like Shell. Primo de Rivera also raised tariffs on foreign goods, with the League of Nations labelling Spain the most protectionist country in the world in 1927. Spanish goods were promoted over foreign goods, and the dictatorship launched campaigns that presented buying Spanish goods as patriotic while it criticised Spaniards who assumed that foreign goods were better quality than Spanish goods.

Primo de Rivera's dictatorship increased spending on public infrastructure and worked to improve roads, railways, irrigation networks, and more. The dictatorship paid for these improvements by taking on large amounts of debt, and this led to a temporary increase in economic growth. Originally, the dictatorship was going to fund these improvements by implementing a progressive tax system, where Spain's wealthiest people would pay more in tax. This plan was dropped after much resistance from the upper classes. In 1929, Spain experienced an economic downturn that coincided with the start of the Great Depression, and Spaniards lost confidence in Primo de Rivera's dictatorship. The dictatorship also struggled to maintain the exchange rate of Spain's currency, the peseta, and no economic policy it tried stopped the peseta from falling in value.

Social change 

In 1924, the dictatorship of Primo de Rivera gave unmarried women the right to vote in local elections if they were older than 23 and not subject to any parental authority. Women were also allowed to run for office in town councils, and fourteen women were invited to be on the National Assembly in 1927. However, Primo de Rivera made his view on the role of women clear, saying: "Women can do as much good as men, and undertake and accomplish all the tasks performed by men. But there is one that is essential in women: housekeeping, and that is what really underscores their importance." The dictatorship encouraged large families, and in 1926 it started subsidising families with more than eight children. The dictatorship also protected the rights of individual workers with its 1926 labour code. It introduced maternity benefits and allowed nursing mothers a paid hour each day to feed their babies. In November 1926, the dictatorship created the National Corporative Association, where committees representing trade and industry would meet with an equal proportion of employers and employee representatives. They discussed legislation and aimed to solve labour conflicts between the groups. Women's participation in the workforce as skilled workers also increased rapidly from 1925 to 1930, as did the percentage of women in apprenticeship programs, which rose from 32.6% to 36.4% throughout the late 1920s. James Rial notes that these changes in women's status occurred without any political undertakings from the dictatorship.

The dictatorship's collapse (1930) 
The economic struggles of 1929 and the dictatorship's failure to stabilise the value of the peseta were large hits to its reputation. According to Carr, "it was not, however, the collapse of prosperity 1929 that brought down the regime: the fundamental failure was a political failure." Primo de Rivera failed to establish political legitimacy for his rule. The 1876 constitution was suspended when he came to power, and the new constitution created by the National Assembly was rejected by the monarchists, liberals, and republicans. The army also had grievances with Primo de Rivera and his dictatorship. These complaints mainly came from members of Spain's artillery corps, whom Primo de Rivera suspended in 1926. As the king saw Primo de Rivera lose support among the army, he could no longer support Primo de Rivera's dictatorship, and Primo de Rivera resigned on 28 January 1930, ending his dictatorship.

Legacy 

Following Primo de Rivera's resignation, the king appointed General Damaso Berenguer as the new Prime Minister of Spain. Berenguer prepared to return to the parliamentary monarchy that existed before Primo de Rivera's dictatorship. This plan was opposed by republicans, socialists, and people like Niceto Alcalá‐Zamora, who no longer supported Alfonso XIII or the monarchy. In Spain's next elections in 1931, republicans and their coalition (including the communists and socialists) won a majority of city council seats over monarchists in urban centres and provincial capitals. These results demonstrated how the public no longer favoured King Alfonso XIII. He resigned after the election, and Spain's Second Republic was established on the 14 or 15 of April 1931.

See also 
European interwar dictatorships
Restoration (Spain)

Notes

References

Bibliography 

 
 
 

*

External links 

 "Primo de Rivera (1923–30) and the Second Republic (1931–36)" at Encyclopædia Britannica

 
Military dictatorships
20th century in Spain